Crepis capillaris, the smooth hawksbeard, is a species of flowering plant in the tribe Cichorieae within the family Asteraceae, and is native to Europe. It has become naturalized in other lands and is regarded as a weed in some places.

Crepis capillaris is a low, annual plant common in disturbed ground and open habitats, such as thin grassland, lawns, spoil heaps, rocky banks and on roadsides, the stems often trailing along the ground but sometimes erect, the leaves sometimes forming a rosette. It flowers from June to December in the Northern Hemisphere, producing an array of numerous small flower heads. Each head has as many as 60 yellow ray florets but no disc florets.

References

External links

Jepson Manual Treatment of Crepis capillaris — invasive plant species.
USDA Plants Profile for Crepis capillaris — invasive plant species.
UC Calphotos gallery

capillaris
Flora of Europe
Plants described in 1753
Taxa named by Carl Linnaeus